Patricia Batista da Silva (born 8 April 1992) is a Brazilian handball player for Thüringer HC and the Brazilian national team.

She has played in the 2012 Women's Junior World Handball Championship.

References

1992 births
Living people
Brazilian female handball players
Expatriate handball players in Turkey
Brazilian expatriate sportspeople in France
Brazilian expatriate sportspeople in Germany
Brazilian expatriate sportspeople in Turkey
Handball players from São Paulo
Kastamonu Bld. SK (women's handball) players
South American Games gold medalists for Brazil
South American Games medalists in handball
Competitors at the 2014 South American Games
Competitors at the 2018 South American Games
21st-century Brazilian women